The Blind Judge (German: Der blinde Richter) is a 1984 West German historical crime television series broadcast on ARD in thirteen episodes. It is based on the career of the eighteenth century British magistrate John Fielding.

Main cast
 Franz Josef Steffens as Sir John Fielding
 Gert Schaefer as Henry Fielding
 Rainer Schmitt as Saunder Welch
 Joachim Dietmar Mues as William Hogarth
 Walter Jokisch as Sam Johnson
 Ingolf Gorges as  David Garrick
 Wolfgang Kaven as  Patrick

References

Bibliography
 Apropos, Film: das Jahrbuch der DEFA-Stiftung. Verlag Das Neue Berlin, 2003.

External links
 

1984 German television series debuts
1984 German television series endings
1980s crime television series
German-language television shows
German crime television series
Television series set in the 18th century
Television shows set in London